Flight of the Behemoth (also known as 3:  Flight of the Behemoth) is the second album by Sunn O))).

Background and release 

The band collaborated with the Japanese noise artist Merzbow, who mixed tracks 3 and 4, and a recording of the two performing together at the 2007 Earthdom Festival in Tokyo was added for a 2007 2CD reissue in Japan. Southern Lord released this version as a download on Bandcamp in 2013.

The French label Bisect Bleep Industries released the first pressings of the 2LP version in 2002 (200 copies on black vinyl, 150 on red, 150 on clear), with the bonus track "Grimm & Bear It", which was recorded live at Gaba in Los Angeles in 1998. Southern Lord remastered and re-released this version (800 copies on gold & black splatter vinyl for Record Store Day 2020's third drop, 500 on gold) in 2020. "Grimm & Bear It" was later included as a bonus track on the 2005 CD reissue of The Grimmrobe Demos.

Sunn O))) used a drum machine and their own vocals for the first time ever on the track "F.W.T.B.T.", an interpretation of Metallica's "For Whom the Bell Tolls".

Track listing

2LP bonus track

2CD/Bandcamp bonus tracks

Session musicians
Aspirin Feast – drums on "F.W.T.B.T."
Bootsy Kronos – bass guitar on "F.W.T.B.T."

2002 albums
Southern Lord Records albums
Sunn O))) albums